Weightlifting at the 2011 Pacific Games in Nouméa, New Caledonia was held on September 5–7, 2011.

Medal summary

Medal table

Ranking by Big (Total result) medals

Ranking by all medals: Big (Total result) and Small (Snatch and Clean & Jerk)

Men

Women

See also
 Weightlifting at the Pacific Games

References

Weightlifting at the 2011 Pacific Games

2011 Pacific Games
Pacific Games
2011
Weightlifting in New Caledonia